Rob Savoye is the primary developer of Gnash. He is a developer for the GNU Project, having worked on Debian, Red Hat and dozens of other free/open source software projects. He was among the first employees of Cygnus Support, which was sold to Red Hat in 2001.

Activities 
He began programming computers in 1977 using Fortran 4. Some of the projects he has worked on include the GNU Compiler Collection, GNU Debugger, DejaGnu, Newlib, Libgloss, Cygwin, eCos, the Center-TRACON Automation System, Expect, multiple major Linux distributions, and One Laptop Per Child.

Rob Savoye manages an unofficial website for the Rainbow Family of Living Light.

He resides outside of Nederland, Colorado and is an avid ice climber and outdoorsman. Additionally, Rob is involved in search and rescue of lost and stranded hikers and climbers, and is a founding member of IMSAR (the Ilchester Mountain Search and Rescue organization).

Awards 
At Libre Planet 2011, Savoye received the individual achievement FSF Award for the advancement of Free Software for decades of work on free software projects, particularly his leading role in the development of Gnash.

References

External links

 Home Page
 Welcomehome.org, unofficial homepage of the Rainbow Family of Living Light
 O'Reilly EuroOSCON: Rob Savoye of Gnash (video)
 eokyere interview on Gnash
 FLOSS Weekly, Episode 94, November 5th, 2009 – Interview on Gnash

Computer programmers
GNU people
Living people
Year of birth missing (living people)